Abdul Ismail (born 8 December 1948) is a Mozambican hurdler. He competed in the men's 110 metres hurdles at the 1980 Summer Olympics.

References

External links
 

1948 births
Living people
Athletes (track and field) at the 1980 Summer Olympics
Mozambican male hurdlers
Olympic athletes of Mozambique
Place of birth missing (living people)